Six at Midnight is a digital-only EP by The Like Young.  Featuring six cover versions of songs from the 1950s and 1960s, it was released on Tight Ship Records in 2005.

Track listing
 Always Waitin'
 A Million Miles Away
 Our Love Can Still Be Saved
 Eddie My Love
 I Love How You Love Me
 I'm In Love

The Like Young EPs
2005 EPs